The 2010 Shannons V8 Touring Car National Series is the third running of the V8 Touring Car National Series. The series takes place on the program of Shannons Nationals Motor Racing Championships events. The Series began at Symmons Plains Raceway on 10 April and finished at Sandown Raceway on 24 October. Entries were hit hard in 2010 with just seven cars appearing across the opening two rounds and only three appearing at both of the first two events. Entries picked up after that, peaking at 14 cars at Winton.

Experienced V8 Supercar racer Tony Evangelou clinched the championship a round early at Eastern Creek Raceway. Evengelou won eight of the 15 races, including all five rounds. Evangelou dominated the point score, over 200 points ahead of Terry Wyhoon, who moved into second place passing Chris Smerdon at the final round. Wyhoon collected four of the race wins Evangelou did not with the other three won by Dean Neville, Scott Loadsman and Sam Walter.

Calendar

The 2010 Shannons V8 Touring Car National Series will consist of five rounds held across four states:

Points structure
Points awarded for Time Attack are dependent on number of cars that take part in qualifying, with the winner scoring two points for each car to compete with gaps of two descending from that point.

Teams and drivers
The following teams and drivers have competed during the 2010 Shannons V8 Touring Car National Series.

Driver standings

See also
2010 V8 Supercar season

External links
 Official series website

References

Shannons V8 Touring Car National Series
V8 Touring Car Series